Nemiah Wilson (born April 6, 1943) was an American football player. A defensive back, he played college football at Grambling State University, and played professionally in the American Football League (AFL) for the Denver Broncos from 1965 through 1967, and then for the AFL's Oakland Raiders in from 1968 through 1974, time which included the 1970 merger between the AFL and the NFL. He finished his career playing one final season for the Chicago Bears in 1975. He was the oldest American Football League All-Star in 1967.

References

1943 births
Living people
American football defensive backs
Chicago Bears players
Denver Broncos (AFL) players
Grambling State Tigers football players
Oakland Raiders players
American Football League All-Star players
Players of American football from Baton Rouge, Louisiana
African-American players of American football
American Football League players
21st-century African-American people
20th-century African-American sportspeople